This is a list of equipment used by the Republic of China Army.

Small arms

Watercraft

Armoured vehicles

Artillery

Helicopters and unmanned aerial vehicle

Anti-aircraft weapons

Anti-tank weapons

References

Republic of China Army
Republic of China
Military equipment of the Republic of China